Berlepsch is a German surname. Notable people with the surname include:

Baron August von Berlepsch (1815–1877), beekeeper
Baron August Adolph von Berlepsch (1790–1867), head state forester of Saxony
Baron Dietrich Otto von Berlepsch (1823–1896), president of the state consistory of the Evangelical-Lutheran Church of Saxony
Emilie von Berlepsch (née von Oppel; 1755–1830), German author
Erich Volkmar von Berlepsch (ca. 1525–1589), judge and senior civil servant
Baron Friedrich Ludwig von Berlepsch (1749–1818), judge in Hanover
Hans von Berlepsch (ca. 1480–1533), civil servant at Wartburg Castle who sheltered Martin Luther
Baron Hans von Berlepsch (1857–1933), ornithologist
Count Hans von Berlepsch (1850–1915), ornithologist
Hans Eduard von Berlepsch-Valendas (1849–1921), Swiss architect and painter
Baron Hans Hermann von Berlepsch (1843–1926), Prussian government minister
Hartmann von Berlepsch (1601–1671), cavalry captain
Heinrich Moritz von Berlepsch (1736–1809), Saxon chamberlain
Count Karl von Berlepsch (1882–1955), regional poet and author
Count Karl von Berlepsch (1821–1893), hereditary treasurer of the Electorate of Hesse
Karoline von Berlepsch (1820–1877), Countess of Bergen
Otto Wilhelm von Berlepsch (1618–1683), Saxon general
Baron Tilo von Berlepsch (1913–1991), actor

German-language surnames